Len Clay Stadium is a multi-use stadium in Obuasi, Ghana. It was opened on 10 May 1990 and renovated on 17 April 2005  and is home to Ashanti Gold Sporting Club. It has capacity for 20,000 people.

History
Len Clay Stadium was opened on 10 May 1990 by the former president of Ghana, Jerry Rawlings. The stadium is dedicated to Len Clay, a former Group Engineering and Projects Manager of Ashanti Goldfield Company and supporter of the team.

The stadium was designed by Enninful Design Services and built by A.Lang with Arc Charles Blankson-Hemans as the project manager for EDS., who also built the Enyinam Housing Project and Enyinam lodge amongst others and different projects across Ghana.

Stadium features
The stadium features automatic turnstiles, car park and over 1,300 seats in the main Grandstand, as well as six Executive Boxes, each with its own air-conditioning and room for 40 seats.

Stadium complex
The Stadium complex includes an athletic track, P.A. system, video cameras, V.I.P. car park, toilets and a bar with a function room. A multi-gym and electronic scoreboard, as well as floodlighting.

References

External links
Len Clay Stadium – Soccerway

Buildings and structures completed in 1990
Football venues in Ghana
Sports venues completed in 2005
Sports venues in Ghana